HMS Intrepid was a 64-gun third-rate ship of the line of the Royal Navy, launched on 4 December 1770 at Woolwich. She was sold in 1828.

Initial service
In 1772 Intrepid sailed to the Dutch East Indies. The ship's master on this journey was John Hunter, later an admiral and the second Governor of New South Wales.

She took part in the Battle of the Chesapeake in 1781.

French Revolutionary Wars
Intrepid and  captured the advice-brig Serin off San Domingo on 31 July 1794.

In February 1796, Intrepid was patrolling near Cap-François looking for reinforcements expected from Cork when she encountered a French corvette. After a chase of ten hours, the corvette ran ashore in a cove to the east of Porto Plata, where her crew abandoned her, enabling the British to retrieve her. She turned out to be , armed with twenty 9-pounder guns and six brass 2-pounders, with a crew of 200 men under the command of Citoyen Jacque Clement Tourtellet. She had left La Rochelle on 6 December 1795 under orders from the Minister of Marine and Colonies not to communicate with any vessel on the way. The British took her into service as the sixth-rate HMS Jamaica.  must have been in company or in sight as she shared in the proceeds of the capture.

Captain Sir William Hargood took command of Intrepid and convoyed a fleet of nine East Indiamen to China.

Hargood remained and Intrepid remained in China until the Peace of Amiens in 1802, defending Macau at the Macau Incident of January 1799.

On 4 April 1801, Intrepid captured Chance. The prize agent failed and what prize money could be recovered from his estate was not paid until 1828.

Napoleonic Wars
In April 1809, a strong French squadron arrived at the Îles des Saintes, south of Guadeloupe. Intrepid was among the naval vessels that shared in the proceeds of the capture of the islands.

Fate
The Navy fitted Intrepid as a receiving ship in May 1810. She then went into Ordinary until 1815.

On 26 March 1828, the "Principal Officers and Commissioners of His Majesty's Navy" offered for sale at Plymouth "Intrepid, of 50 guns and 1374 tons". The Navy sold Intrepid for £3,030 on that day to D. Beatson.

Notes, citations, and reference
Notes

Citations

References

External links
 

Ships of the line of the Royal Navy
Intrepid-class ships of the line
Ships built in Woolwich
1770 ships